Christine Welsh is a Canadian filmmaker, feminist and associate professor.

See also
Christie Welsh (born 1981), American soccer player
Kirsten Welsh, Canadian ice hockey player
Chris Welsh (disambiguation)
Christy Walsh (disambiguation)